Samira Pereira da Silva Rocha (born 26 January 1989) is a Brazilian handball player for Kisvárdai KC and the Brazilian national team.

She participated at the 2011 World Women's Handball Championship in Brazil.

Achievements
Austrian League:
Winner: 2012
Austrian Cup:
Winner: 2012
Russian Superleague:
Bronze Medalist: 2013
EHF Challenge Cup:
Semifinalist: 2014
World Championship:
Winner: 2013
Pan American Championship:
Winner: 2011, 2013, 2015
Pan American Games
Winner:2011, 2015
South American Championship:
Winner: 2013

Individual awards
 All Star Team Left Wing of the Pan American Championship: 2015, 2017
 Top Scorer of the Women's Four Nations: 2016
 MVP of the Pan American Championship: 2017

References

External links

1989 births
Living people
Handball players at the 2011 Pan American Games
Handball players at the 2015 Pan American Games
Handball players at the 2012 Summer Olympics
Handball players at the 2016 Summer Olympics
Olympic handball players of Brazil
Brazilian female handball players
Pan American Games gold medalists for Brazil
Pan American Games medalists in handball
Brazilian expatriate sportspeople in Austria
Brazilian expatriates in France
Brazilian expatriates in Hungary
Brazilian expatriates in Russia
Expatriate handball players
Sportspeople from Recife
Medalists at the 2015 Pan American Games
Medalists at the 2011 Pan American Games
20th-century Brazilian women
21st-century Brazilian women